La Selva (Spanish for the jungle) may refer to:

 La Selva Beach, California
 La Selva Biological Station, in Costa Rica, one of the Organization for Tropical Studies research stations
 La Selva de Mar, a municipality in the comarca of the Alt Empordà in Catalonia, Spain
 La Selva del Camp, municipality in Tarragona, Spain
 La Selva, 1998 field recordings album by Francisco López

People
, Canadian actress
Roberto de la Selva (1895–1957), Mexican artist, brother of Salomón de la Selva
Salomón de la Selva (1893–1959), Nicaraguan poet
Vincent La Selva (1929–2017), American conductor

See also
Selva (disambiguation)
Selva, a coastal comarca (county) in Catalonia, Spain